Janglatmandi (Urdu)is a neighborhood located in Anantnag district, Jammu and Kashmir, India. The Government Medical College, Anantnag is located in Janglat Mandi. Janglat Mandi is usually considered as a very trafficked place due to poor traffic management, the authorities have proposed new plans to overcome this.

On 31 December 2020, A Police officer Named( Mohd Shafi Khan) Died due to heart attack outside of the hospital with his duty boots on, all the major police officials paid rich tribute to him.

Nearby locations
An Eid Gah is also located in Janglatmandi known as Hanfia Eid Gah Janglatmandi.

References

Anantnag district